A lazo or lasso ( or ), also called in Mexico reata and la reata, and in the United States riata, or lariat (from Mexican Spanish, lasso for roping cattle), is a loop of rope designed as a restraint to be thrown around a target and tightened when pulled. It is a well-known tool of the Mexican and South American cowboys, then adopted, from the Mexicans, by the cowboys of the United States. The word is also a verb; to lasso is to throw the loop of rope around something.

Overview
A lasso is made from stiff rope so that the noose stays open when the lasso is thrown. It also allows the cowboy to easily open up the noose from horseback to release the cattle because the rope is stiff enough to be pushed a little. A high quality lasso is weighted for better handling. The lariat has a small reinforced loop at one end, called a honda or hondo, through which the rope passes to form a loop. The honda can be formed by a honda knot (or another loop knot), an eye splice, a seizing, rawhide, or a metal ring. The other end is sometimes tied simply in a small, tight, overhand knot to prevent fraying. Mexican maguey (agave) and cotton ropes are also used in the longer lengths.

The lasso is used today in rodeos as part of the competitive events, such as calf roping and team roping. It is also still used on working ranches to capture cattle or other livestock when necessary. After catching the cattle, the lasso can be tied or wrapped (dallied) around the horn, a typical feature on the front of a western saddle. With the lasso around the horn, the cowboy can use his horse analogously to a tow truck with a winch.

Part of the historical culture of both the vaqueros of Mexico and the cowboys of the Western United States is a related skill now called "trick roping", a performance of assorted lasso spinning tricks. The Hollywood film star Will Rogers was a well-known practitioner of trick roping and the natural horsemanship practitioner Buck Brannaman also got his start as a trick roper when he was a child.

Etymology
The word lasso seems to have begun to be used as an English word in the early nineteenth century. It may have originated from the Castilian word lazo, which is first attested in the thirteenth century in the sense 'noose, snare', and derives in turn from classical Latin laqueus ('noose, snare, trap, bond, tie').

The rope or lasso used to restrain cattle is also called a Reata or La Reata in Mexico, which was Anglicized to “Lariat” or “Riata” in the United States. In Spain, the word reata has four definitions: 1) the rope that ties one horse or mule to another to make them go in a straight line; 2) the leading mule of three that draw a cart; 3) a rope used for binding masts and spars (woolding); and 4) figuratively, it means the submission to the opinion of others. 

Other names are used in various countries where the Lasso is used. In Argentina, Chile and Venezuela is simply called “El Lazo” or “El Lazo Criollo”. In Colombia the equipment is called “Rejo”, in Costa Rica “Coyunda”, in Ecuador “Beta”, and Peru “Guasca”. Meanwhile in Colombia, the term Reata or Riata means: hardened, firm, rigid, severe; it also refers to a belt for pants.

History

Lassos are not only part of North American culture; relief carvings at the ancient Egyptian temple of Pharaoh Seti I at Abydos, built c.1280 BC, show the pharaoh holding a lasso, then holding onto a bull roped around the horns. Huns are recorded as using lassos in battle to ensnare opponents prepared to defend themselves in hand-to-hand combat around AD 370. They were also used by Tatars and are still used by the Sami people and Finns in reindeer herding. In Mongolia, a variant of the lasso called an uurga is used, consisting of a rope loop at the end of a long pole.

Lassoes are also mentioned in the Greek Histories of Herodotus; seventh book. Polymnia 7.85 records: "The wandering tribe known by the name of Sagartians – a people Persian in language, and in dress half Persian, half Pactyan, who furnished the army as many as eight thousand horse. It is not the wont of this people to carry arms, either of bronze or steel, except only a dirk; but they use lassoes made of thongs plaited together, and trust to these whenever they go to the wars. Now the manner in which they fight is the following: when they meet their enemy, straightway they discharge their lassoes, which end in a noose; then, whatever the noose encircles, be it man or be it horse, they drag towards them; and the foe, entangled in the toils, is forthwith slain. Such is the manner in which this people fight; and now their horsemen were drawn up with the Persians".

Lasso is mentioned by some sources as one of the pieces of equipment of the Aswaran, the cavalry force of the Sasanian Empire.

On the American continent, the method of roping cattle developed in Mexico as a way of managing and controlling individual animals (lassoing). The tool that was used was called a lariat. Furthermore, in order for this tool to be more productive, the Spanish war saddle evolved into the working saddle of the 19th century. Although a simple tool, many decades if not a century had to pass for this system to be perfected in Mexico.
Before the lasso or lariat were successfully implemented in the Mexican style of work, the use of a hocking knife (crescent-shaped blade on a pole that was used to cut the ligaments in a cow's hocks) was used to stop and control the cattle. The hocking knife was similar to the Spanish spear (lanza) that was used to manipulate cattle as well as for combat.

See also
 Bolas
 Hogtie
 Lasso tool

References

External links

 The Lasso: A Rational Guide to Trick Roping by Carey Bunks
 "How to Handle a Rope – Champ Gives Lessons." Popular Science, June 1942, pp. 82–87.
 Origem da Modalidade de Laço Campista by Associação do Laço Campista

American frontier
Livestock
Rodeo equipment
Ropes
Roping (rodeo)
Western (genre) staples and terminology